Enrico Ferri may refer to:

 Enrico Ferri (politician) (born 1942), Italian politician and magistrate
 Enrico Ferri (criminologist) (1856–1929), Italian criminologist